Herman Millakowsky (27 July 1892 – 12 February 1987) was a German film producer. He studied history of art and philosophy at the University of Berlin. Following the Nazi rise to power he emigrated to Paris, where he worked in the French film industry. He later settled in the United States.

Selected filmography
 The Circus of Life (1926)
 The Girl on a Swing (1926)
 Our Daily Bread (1926)
 Grandstand for General Staff (1926)
 Potsdam (1927)
 The President (1928)
 The Secret Courier (1928)
 The Adjutant of the Czar (1929)
 The King of Paris (1930)
 There Is a Woman Who Never Forgets You (1930)
 Two Worlds (1930)
 Love and Champagne (1930)
 Eight Days of Happiness (1931)
 The Love Express (1931)
 The Typist (1931)
 The Private Secretary (1931)
 The Opera Ball (1931)
 A Night at the Grand Hotel (1931)
 A Bit of Love (1932)
 Gypsies of the Night (1932)
 Overnight Sensation (1932)
 Monsieur, Madame and Bibi (1932)
 Liebelei (1933)
 Les yeux noirs (1935)
 Antonia (1935)
 27 Rue de la Paix (1936)
 The Volga Boatman (1936)
 Yoshiwara (1937)
  (1938)
 Ultimatum (1938)
 Immediate Call (1939)
 Women in Bondage (1943)
 Faces in the Fog (1944)
 Girls of the Big House (1945)
 Murder in the Music Hall (1946)
 Fear (1954)

References

Bibliography
 Lutz Bacher. Max Ophuls in the Hollywood Studios. Rutgers University Press, 1996.

External links

1892 births
1987 deaths
German art directors
German emigrants to the United States
Emigrants from Nazi Germany to France